Xie Zhong (born September 19, 1998) is a Chinese pair skater. With his former skating partner, Gao Yumeng, he is the 2017 World Junior bronze medalist and 2017 Chinese national bronze medalist on the senior level.

Early career 
Xie began learning to skate in 2003. Following a partnership with Wang Wen, he teamed up with Zhang Mingyang. The two competed on the 2013 Junior Grand Prix (JGP) series, placing fourth in August in Riga, Latvia.

Xie placed fifth skating with Zhang Ziyi at the Chinese Championships in December 2014.

2015–2016 season 
During the 2015–2016 season, Xie skated in partnership with Zhao Ying. They appeared at two 2015 JGP events, placing 8th in August in Riga, Latvia, and 7th the following month in Linz, Austria. Competing on the senior level, the pair won the bronze medal at the Chinese Championships in December. They placed 5th at the 2016 Winter Youth Olympics, held in February in Hamar, Norway.

Zhao/Xie were assigned to the 2016 World Junior Championships but withdrew a couple of weeks before the start of the event. The pair was coached by Luan Bo, Song Lun, and Li Yanwei in Harbin, China.

Partnership with Gao Yumeng 
Xie and Gao Yumeng are coached by Zhao Hongbo in Beijing.

2016–2017 season  
Making their international debut as a pair, Gao/Xie placed 5th at a Junior Grand Prix (JGP) event in early September 2016 in Ostrava, Czech Republic. They had the same result at their second JGP assignment, in Saransk, Russia. In December, they won the bronze medal competing as seniors at the Chinese Championships.

In March 2017, Gao/Xie won the bronze medal at the World Junior Championships in Taipei, having ranked second in the short program and third in the free skate.

2017–2018 season 
Gao/Xie placed 4th at JGP Poland and 2nd at JGP Croatia, qualifying for the Junior Grand Prix Final (JGPF). They finished 4th at both JGPF and World Junior Championships. They split at the end of this season.

Programs

With Chelsea Liu

With Li Xiangning

With Gao Yumeng

With Zhao Ying

With Zhang Mingyang

Competitive highlights 
GP: Grand Prix; JGP: Junior Grand Prix

With Liu

With Li Xiangning

With Gao Yumeng

Earlier partnerships

References

External links 
 

1998 births
Chinese male pair skaters
Living people
Figure skaters from Harbin
Figure skaters at the 2016 Winter Youth Olympics
World Junior Figure Skating Championships medalists